At least three warships of Japan have been named Oyashio:

, a  launched in 1938 and sunk in 1943.
, a submarine launched in 1959 and scrapped in 1977.
, an  launched in 1996.

Japanese Navy ship names
Japan Maritime Self-Defense Force ship names